Angela's Christmas Wish is an Irish animated family film written and directed by Damien O'Connor. It was released on Netflix on 1 December 2020. It features the voices of Lucy O'Connell, Brendan Mullins and Ruth Negga. The main character is Angela, and she wishes to reunite her family for Christmas, particularly her father who is working in Australia.

It is the sequel to Angela's Christmas, which was nominated for an Emmy, and inspired by a story written by Frank McCourt.

Main cast
Caitríona Balfe as Dorothy's mother
Oscar Butler as Tom
Moe Dunford as Father
Shona Hamill as Aggie
Jared Harris as the Vet
Pat Kinevane as Mr McGinty
Lola Metcalfe as Dorothy
Janet Moran as Mrs Blake
Brendan Mullins as Pat
Ruth Negga as Mother
James Nolan as Dock Worker
Lucy O'Connell as Angela
Anya O'Connor as Young Angela
Don Wycherley as accordion player

Reception
In an interview, the director Damien O'Connor spoke about the difficulties of writing the sequel, particularly given that the author, Frank McCourt, died in 2009, and the first film used all of McCourt's original source material.

Common Sense Media gave Angela's Christmas Wish 4 stars out of 5 and praised the character strengths.

References

External links
 
 

2020 films
English-language Irish films
2020 computer-animated films
Irish animated films
2020s English-language films
Irish children's films